is a Japanese politician and member of the House of Councillors for the Japanese Communist Party.

1955 births
Living people
People from Sapporo
Female members of the House of Councillors (Japan)
Members of the House of Councillors (Japan)
Japanese Communist Party politicians